Tiger Woods PGA Tour 09 is a sports video game developed by EA Tiburon for the PlayStation 3, Wii (titled Tiger Woods PGA 09 All Play) and Xbox 360 versions and Exient Entertainment for the PlayStation 2 and PlayStation Portable versions and published by EA Sports for PlayStation 2, PlayStation 3, PlayStation Portable, Wii and Xbox 360.

Reception

Tiger Woods PGA Tour 09 received "mixed or average" reviews on the PlayStation Portable and "generally favorable" reviews on other platforms, according to review aggregator Metacritic.

In Japan, where the PlayStation 3, Xbox 360, and Wii versions were released in 2008 to 2009, Famitsu gave the PS3 and Xbox 360 versions a score of one six, one seven, one six and one seven, for a total of 26 out of 40; the same magazine later gave the Wii version a better score of one seven, one eight, one seven and one eight, for a total of 30 out of 40.

The Wii version was nominated for several Wii-specific awards by IGN in its 2008 video game awards, including Best Sports Game, Best Local Multiplayer Game, Best Online Multiplayer Game, and Best Use of the Wii-Mote.

References

External links
 
 

2008 video games
EA Sports games
Golf video games
Nintendo Wi-Fi Connection games
PlayStation 2 games
PlayStation 3 games
PlayStation Portable games
Sports video games set in the United States
Tiger Woods video games
Video games developed in the United States
Video games set in China
Video games set in Shanghai
Video games set in South Africa
Video games set in the United Kingdom
Wii Wi-Fi games
Xbox 360 games
Exient Entertainment games
Multiplayer and single-player video games